Nocciolini di Chivasso are small round cookies made with meringue (sugar and egg whites) and hazelnuts that are typical of the town of Chivasso, in the Province of Turin in the Italian region Piedmont. They are similar to Nocciolini di Canzo, which are a protected specialties of the Lombardy Region.

See also

 List of cookies

References

Cookies
Italian pastries
Cuisine of Piedmont
Meringue desserts